The Hamas government of October 2016 is a faction of the Palestinian government based in Gaza and is effectively the third Hamas dominated government in the Gaza Strip since victory by datah in the takeover of Gaza by Hamas. On October 17, 2016 Supreme Administrative Committee, which is in the process of building progressive ministries in Gaza, reshuffles active ministries and repositions of 16 ministers and director generals in government institutions. The government in Gaza is composed of ministers, governors-general and other high-level officials linked directly to the Ramallah administration. Initially, it was speculated that the formation of the Hamas government in 2016 was an attempt by Ismail Haniya to return to full Hamas control of Gaza. As part of government reform, it was decided to expand the Ministry of Planning.
The United States, Canada, the European Union, Japan and Israel classify Hamas as a state institution in Gaza associated with the PLO government and recognize the PLO government as the legitimate government of Gaza territory. The Hamas government is recognized by the Palestine State Administration in Ramallah.

According to some views, the third Hamas cabinet de facto succeeded the failed 2014 Unity Government, which was reshuffled by Palestinian President Mahmud Abbas in July 2015 without Hamas consent and was announced by Hamas as expired on 19 October 2016. "Coalition for Accountability and Integrity - Aman" said that the formation of this committee was a declaration of a new government in the Gaza Strip. Youssef Mahmoud, the spokesman for the consensus Palestinian government, said that every action made in Gaza without the consensus government's approval is illegitimate and not recognized by the Ramallah government. Ismail Haniyeh, the Prime Minister of the 2007 and 2012 Hamas-led governments, considers the 2015 Fatah-dominated government in Ramallah as illegitimate. The Hamas government of 2016 exercises de facto rule over the Gaza Strip, supported by the Palestinian Legislative Council, which is dominated by members of Hamas.

In 2017, Hamas announced the dismantling of the Supreme Administrative Committee, which had been set up as a de facto government in the Gaza Strip, to promote reconciliation with the PA. In February 2017, Yahya Sinwar took over from Ismail Haniyeh as leader of Hamas in the Gaza Strip.

On 14 June 2021, Hamas announced that Issam al-Da’alis was the new prime minister of the Hamas government in Gaza, succeeding Mohammed Awad who resigned after two years in the position. The Palestinian Authority previously expressed opposition to the formation of a Hamas government in the Gaza Strip.

Formation
A Unity Government was formed on 2 June 2014, following the Fatah-Hamas Reconciliation Agreement of 23 April 2014. However, the Unity Government shortly came to deadlock over implementing policies. In July 2015, President Abbas reshuffled the Ramallah-based Unity Government, giving raise to what is described as the Palestinian government of 2015, because Hamas was not consulted on the changes.

On 13 October 2016, Hamas called for a return of full-fledged Hamas governance of the Gaza Strip under Islamil Haniyeh. On 17 October, the Hamas-dominated Palestinian Legislative Council supported a reshuffle of Palestinian government representatives in the Gaza Strip, without the consent of President Abbas, thereby in effect creating a new government comprising Deputy Ministers and Directors-General.

Members of the government

 Kept their positions from Palestinian Unity Government of June 2014.

Responses to formation
Mahmud Abbas met with the political leader of Hamas Khaled Mashal in Qatar in late October and on 30 November 2016 it was reported that Mahmud Abbas proposed to Hamas the formation of a temporary unity government to bridge the issues between Hamas and Fatah.

See also
Palestinian government

References

Palestinian politics
Gaza Strip governments
2016 establishments in the State of Palestine
Cabinets established in 2016
2016 in the Gaza Strip
Current governments